The following is a list of notable deaths in May 1993.

Entries for each day are listed alphabetically by surname. A typical entry lists information in the following sequence:
 Name, age, country of citizenship at birth, subsequent country of citizenship (if applicable), reason for notability, cause of death (if known), and reference.

May 1993

1
Pietro Acquarone, 76, Italian footballer (Sanremese, Roma, Pisa).
Erwan Bergot, 63, French army officer and author.
Pierre Bérégovoy, 67, French politician and prime minister (1992–1993), suicide by gunshot.
Alfredo Pareja Diezcanseco, 84, Ecuadorian novelist, journalist, and diplomat.
Donald Dupree, 74, American bobsledder and Olympic medalist.
Henri Ellenberger, 87, Canadian psychiatrist, medical historian, and criminologist.
Gerald Fowler, 58, British politician, MP (1966–1970, 1974–1979), cancer.
Narayan Ganesh Gore, 85, Indian politician.
Warren P. Knowles, 84, American politician and governor (1965–1971), heart attack.
Ranasinghe Premadasa, 68, president, assassination by suicide bomber.

2
Luigi Bestagini, 73, Italian ice hockey player and (Olympian).
Julio Gallo, 83, American winemaker (E & J Gallo Winery), traffic collision.
John S. Gleason, Jr., 78, American banker and political figure.
Thorkild Jacobsen, 88, Danish assyriologist and archaeologist.
Stephen Juba, 78, Canadian politician.
Ivan Lapikov, 70, Soviet-Russian actor (Andrei Rublev, The Brothers Karamazov, Eternal Call).
Karl-Friedrich Merten, 87, German U-boat commander during World War II, cancer.
André Moynet, 71, French fighter pilot, businessman, and politician, MNA (1946–1967).
George Southall, 85, British track cyclist.
Will Weng, 86, American journalist and crossword puzzle editor (The New York Times).

3
Libero Bigiaretti, 86, Italian novelist.
Robert De Niro Sr., 71, American painter, father of Robert De Niro, cancer.
Duncan Macpherson, 68, Canadian cartoonist.
Bjørn Rørholt, 73, Norwegian  military officer, and resistance member during World War II.
Hermína Týrlová, 92, Czech animator, screen writer, and film director.

4
Margret Borgs, 84, German Olympic diver (1928).
Frank Kudelka, 67, American basketball player (Chicago Stags, Washington Capitols, Philadelphia Warriors).
Ray McDonald, 48, American gridiron football player, complications from sickle cell anemia.
Ernst Reitermaier, 74, Austrian football player and manager.
Shianghao Wang, 77, Chinese mathematician.
Amos Wilder, 97, American poet, minister, and theology professor.
France Štiglic, 73, Slovenian film director and screenwriter.

5
Iakov Bielopolski, 76, Soviet architect.
Dermot Boyle, 88, British RAF marshall.
Louis Brooks, 82, American R&B saxophonist and bandleader.
John Brady, 89, Australian trade unionist and politician.
Georges Carrier, 82, French basketball player.
Irving Howe, 72, American socialist activist, cardiovascular disease.
Malcolm Metcalf, 82, American Olympic javelin thrower (1932, 1936).
Dick Metz, 84, American golfer.
Algot Törneman, 83, Swedish painter.
Paul Wegener, 84, German Nazi Party official and politician.

6
Ivy Benson, 79, English musician and bandleader.
Vane Bor, 84, Serbian artist.
Rommel Fernández, 27, Panamanian football player, traffic collision.
Dorothy B. Hughes, 88, American crime writer, literary critic, and historian.
Ian Mikardo, 84, British politician, stroke.
Ann Todd, 86, English actress (The Seventh Veil, The Paradine Case, Perfect Strangers), stroke.

7
Zhao Boping, 90, Chinese politician.
Harold Danforth, 77, Canadian politician, MP (1958–1962, 1963–1974).
Cee Farrow, 36, German-American new wave singer ("Should I Love You"), complications from AIDS.
Roger Keesing, 57, American linguist and anthropologist, heart attack.
Valeriano López, 67, Peruvian footballer (Sport Boys, Deportivo Cali, national team), cerebral hemorrhage.
Mary Philbin, 90, American silent film actress (The Phantom of the Opera, The Man Who Laughs, Love Me and the World Is Mine), pneumonia.
Hap Sharp, 65, American race car driver, suicide.
Thurman Tucker, 75, American baseball player.

8
Dele Charley, 45, Sierra Leonean playwright.
Debiprasad Chattopadhyaya, 74, Indian Marxist philosopher.
Avram Davidson, 70, American fiction writer (The Phoenix and the Mirror, Masters of the Maze, The Adventures of Doctor Eszterhazy).
Enrique Larrinaga, 82, Spanish footballer (Racing de Santander, Asturias, national team).
Alwin Nikolais, 82, American choreographer, cancer.
Gabriel Pita da Veiga y Sanz, 84, Spanish naval admiral, minister of the Navy (1973–1977).
Marti Stevens, 54, American educator and theater director, asthma.
Edward Ward, 7th Viscount Bangor, 87, English-Irish hereditary peer.

9
Ted Cieslak, 80, American Major League Baseball player.
Jacques Dextraze, 73, Canadian military officer.
Mary Duncan, 98, American actress (City Girl, Morning Glory).
Kenneth Eather, 91, Australian Army officer.
Penelope Gilliatt, 61, English novelist and screenwriter (Sunday Bloody Sunday).
Maggie Hemingway, 47, British novelist, aplastic anemia.
Freya Madeline Stark, 100, British-Italian travel writer and explorer.
Albert Sukop, 80, German footballer (Eintracht Braunschweig).

10
Lester del Rey, 77, American science fiction author (Badge of Infamy, Marooned on Mars, Moon of Mutiny).
Peng Mingzhi, 88, Chinese general and diplomat.
Jack Peel, 72, British trade union leader.
Stanisław Piłat, 84, Polish Olympic boxer (1936).
Dermot Sheriff, 72, Irish basketball player.
Egon Vogel, 84, German actor.
Pedro Vuskovic, 69, Croatian-Chilean economist and politician.

11
Zhao Cangbi, 77, Chinese politician and official.
Chen Chi-chuan, 94, Taiwanese politician.
Magli Elster, 80, Norwegian psychoanalyst, literary critic, and poet.
Minnie Gentry, 77, American actress (Def by Temptation, All My Children, School Daze).
Hugh Hudson, 62, Australian politician, cancer.
Sher Mohammad Marri, 58, Pakistani tribal chief and military figure.
Shahu Modak, 75, Indian actor.
Gene Selawski, 57, American gridiron football player.
Torsten Ullman, 84, Swedish Olympic sport shooter (1936, 1948).
Leigh Wiener, 63, American photographer and photojournalist, complications of Sweet's syndrome.

12
Stanisław Baran, 73, Polish football player.
Teodor Bârcă, 98, Moldovan politician and professor.
Zeno Colò, 72, Italian Olympic alpine skier (1952), lung cancer.
Evert Dolman, 47, Dutch cyclist and Olympic champion.
Capt. John Treasure Jones, 87, British sea officer, aneurysm.
Ulf Palme, 72, Swedish film actor.
Edda Seippel, 73, German actress, cancer.
Shamser Bahadur Singh, 82, Indian poet and writer.

13
Robert Adley, 58, British politician, MP (since 1970), heart attack.
Friedrich Dörr, 85, German Catholic priest and professor of theology.
Elton Fax, 83, American illustrator.
Bede Griffiths, 86, British priest and Benedictine monk.
Wolfgang Lotz, 72, Israeli spy.
M. K. Menon, 64, Indian writer.

14
Aziz El-Shawan, 77, Egyptian composer.
Patrick Haemers, 40, Belgian criminal, suicide by hanging.
William Randolph Hearst Jr., 85, American newspaper publisher.
Karin Luts, 89, Estonian painter and a graphic artist.
Melvin Swig, 75, American real estate developer and philanthropist.

15
Kodandera Madappa Cariappa, 94, Indian Commander-in-Chief, arthritis.
Herbert Grötzsch, 90, German mathematician.
Francisco Quiroz, 35, Dominican boxing champion, killed in a nightclub brawl.
John Row, 88, Australian politician.
Robert Tanneveau, 81, French cyclist.

16
Jibaraj Ashrit, 48, Nepali politician, traffic collision.
Madan Kumar Bhandari, 41, Nepali politician, traffic collision.
Eduardo Campbell, 59, Panamanian Olympic wrestler (1960, 1964).
Bernard Chanda, 41, Zambian football player.
Dezső Ákos Hamza, 89, Hungarian film director (Strano appuntamento).
Marv Johnson, 54, American R&B singer, songwriter and pianist, stroke.

17
Henrique Anjos, 41, Portuguese Olympic sailor (1972, 1984, 1988).
Earl Chudoff, 85, American lawyer and politician.
Joe Ploski, 89, Polish-American film and television actor.
Andre Resampa, 68, Madagascar government minister.
Elizabeth Montgomery Wilmot, 91, English artist.
Peter E. Perry, 91, American politician, member of the Pennsylvania House of Representatives (1965–1968, 1969–1976).

18
Heinrich Albertz, 78, German politician, Governing Mayor of Berlin (1966–1967).
Stephen Cheong, 51, Hong Kong industrialist and politician, heart attack.
Ronald Haver, 54, American film historian and author, AIDS-related illness.
Heinz Knoke, 72, German flying ace during World War II and politician.
Domingo Romo, 76, Chilean football player.

19
Nemesio Antúnez, 75, Chilean painter.
Winston Burdett, 79, American broadcast journalist and correspondent.
Oscar Grimes, 78, American Major League Baseball player.
Richard Murphy, 81, American film director (Three Stripes in the Sun) and screenwriter (Boomerang, The Desert Rats), stroke.
Ranga Sohoni, 75, Indian cricketer, heart attack.
Lucien Troupel, 74, French football player and manager.
John A. Wilson, 49, American politician, suicide by hanging.

20
Al Aber, 65, American baseball player (Detroit Tigers, Cleveland Indians, Kansas City Athletics).
Stevan Bodnarov, 87, Serbian sculptor, painter and political commissar.
Virginia Cutler, 87, American academic, Alzheimer's disease.
Dragoljub Janošević, 69, Yugoslav chess grandmaster.
Carmelo Pace, 86, Maltese composer and music professor.

21
John Frost, 80, British Army officer (Battle of Arnhem).
John Holland, 85, American actor (Perry Mason, My Fair Lady, How to Succeed in Business Without Really Trying).
Vytautas Landsbergis-Žemkalnis, 100, Lithuanian architect.
Omar Pkhakadze, 48, Georgian sprint cyclist and Olympic medalist.

22
Herbert Callen, 73, American physicist, Alzheimer's disease.
Mieczysław Horszowski, 100, Polish-American pianist.
David Rees, 57, English author, lecturer and reviewer, AIDS.
Irma Vila, 76, Mexican ranchera singer and actress (Canta y no llores...).
Carl Johan Wachtmeister, 90, Swedish army officer and Olympic fencer (1936).
Juice Wilson, 89, American jazz violinist.

23
Luigi Brunella, 79, Italian football defender and manager.
Julian de Ajuriaguerra, 82, Spanish-French psychologist.
Veniamin Emmanuilovich Dymshits, 83, Soviet engineer and apparatchik.
Jaime Loyola, 61, Puerto Rican Olympic sport shooter (1964).
James Millhollin, 77, American actor (No Time for Sergeants, Grindl, The Student Teachers), cancer.

24
Carl Billquist, 60, Swedish actor.
Jack Gould, 79, American journalist and critic.
Carlton E. Morse, 91, American radio producer (One Man's Family, I Love a Mystery, Adventures by Morse).
Juan Jesús Posadas Ocampo, 66, Mexican Roman Catholic cardinal, shot.

25
Lee Roy Abernathy, 79, American gospel musician ("A Wonderful Time Up There").
Buddhadasa, 86, Thai Buddhist monk and philosopher, cerebral hemorrhage.
Laura Conti, 72, Italian anti-fascist partisan, politician, feminist, and novelist.
Louis O. Coxe, 75, American writer, playwright, and professor.
Rudolf Eckstein, 78, German rower and Olympic champion.
Vincent Eri, 56, Papua New Guinean politician and novelist.
Kimon Friar, 81, Greek-American poet and translator.
David Peterson, 33, American professional wrestler, motorcycle accident.
Dan Seymour, 78, American actor (To Have and Have Not, Key Largo, Mara Maru), complications from a stroke.
Horia Sima, 86, Romanian politician and war criminal.

26
Catherine Caradja, 100, Romanian aristocrat and philanthropist.
Cor de Groot, 78, Dutch pianist and composer.
Tsola Dragoycheva, 94, Bulgarian communist politician.
Fernando Lopez, 89, Filipino politician.
Memos Makris, 80, Greek sculptor.
George Perpich, 72, American football player (Baltimore Colts).
Jack Priestley, 66, American cinematographer.
Joseph Pulitzer, Jr., 80, American publisher (St. Louis Post-Dispatch), colon cancer.
Jan Wiley, 77, American actress (She-Wolf of London, A Fig Leaf for Eve, The Brute Man), cancer.
Ulvi Yenal, 85, Turkish Olympic footballer (1928) and businessman (Turkish Airlines).

27
Tony Del Monaco, 57, Italian pop singer and actor.
Joe Gormley, 75, British trade unionist.
Serge Leroy, 56, French film director (Le mataf, The Track, The Passengers).
Roger MacDougall, 82, Scottish screenwriter and playwright.
Werner Stocker, 38, German actor, brain cancer.

28
Tatari Ali, 64, Nigerian politician, governor of Bauchi State (1979–1983), heart failure.
Charlie Barnett, 82, English cricketer.
Duncan Browne, 46, English singer-songwriter and musician, cancer.
William Collins, 61, Canadian Olympic canoeist (1956).
George Faust, 75, American football player (Chicago Cardinals).
Bobby Joe Green, 57, American gridiron football player, heart attack.
Derek Hersey, 36, British rock climber, climbing accident.
Ugo Locatelli, 77, Italian football player.
Doctor Ross, 67, American blues musician, and one-man band.

29
Billy Conn, 75, American light heavyweight boxing champion.
Alex Kampouris, 80, American baseball player.
Paul Malvern, 90, American film producer, child actor, and stuntman.
Louise McManus, 97, American nurse and academic.
Rahima Moosa, 70, South African politician and activist.

30
Qamar Ajnalvi, 73, Pakistani novelist.
Takeharu Asō, 93, Japanese Olympic cross-country skier (1928).
Gonzalo Barrios, 91, Venezuelan politician.
Ted Garrett, 73, British politician.
Lien Gisolf, 82, Dutch high jumper and Olympic medalist.
Henry Heerup, 85, Danish  painter, graphic artist and sculptor.
Marge, 88, American cartoonist (Little Lulu), lymphoma.
Melvin Spencer Newman, 85, American chemist, Ohio State University professor.
Sun Ra, 79, American jazz composer, bandleader, pianist, and poet, congestive heart failure. .
Mel Rees, 26, Welsh football player, cancer.
Gil Reese, 92, American gridiron football player.

31
Falkner Allison, 86, English Anglican prelate, Bishop of Chelmsford (1951–1961) and Winchester (1961–1974).
Honey Tree Evil Eye, 9, American bull terrier, portrayer of Spuds MacKenzie, kidney failure.
Mabel McKay, 86, Native American basketweaver  and artist.
John Litchfield, 89, British Royal Navy officer and politician.
Donn Tatum, 80, American businessman (Walt Disney Productions), cancer.
Joe Vogler, 80, American politician, homicide.

References 

1993-05
 05